The Cachalot-class submarines were a pair of medium-sized submarines of the United States Navy built under the tonnage limits of the London Naval Treaty of 1930. They were originally named V-8 and V-9, and so were known as "V-boats" even though they were unrelated to the other seven submarines (V-1 through V-7) constructed between World War I and World War II. An extensive study was conducted to determine the optimum submarine size under the treaty restrictions, factoring in total force, endurance, and percentage of the force that could be maintained on station far from a base, as in a Pacific war scenario. Joseph W. Paige of the Navy's Bureau of Construction and Repair (BuC&R) developed the basic design, but the builder, Electric Boat, was responsible for detailed arrangement; this was fairly bold, since Electric Boat had not built any new submarines since finishing four obsolescent boats for Peru. The previous V-boats were all built in naval shipyards. Cuttlefish was the first submarine built at EB's facility in Groton, Connecticut; construction of previous Electric Boat designs had been subcontracted to other shipyards, notably Fore River Shipbuilding of Quincy, Massachusetts.

Design
Although externally much like the later "fleet submarines," internally the Cachalots were quite different. Due to pressure from the Submarine Officers Conference, they featured full double hulls adapted from the Kaiserliche Marine's U-135, direct-drive diesel-electric propulsion systems, a separate crew's mess (reinstated thanks to EB's rearrangement of the internal layout; Portsmouth would follow soon after), and considerable space around the conning tower within the large bridge fairwater (which was drastically cut down in World War II when the 3-inch (76 mm) deck gun was relocated forward of the bridge). The 3-inch gun was selected because it was felt at the time that a larger gun would encourage submarine captains to fight on the surface against superior anti-submarine ships; this remained the standard submarine deck gun until early in World War II, when war experience showed that a larger gun was needed.

EB greatly expanded on the use of electric welding that had been pioneered by Portsmouth on the earlier V-boats. On Cuttlefish, most of the outer hull and the fuel tanks were welded, while the inner pressure hull remained riveted. Portsmouth, while welding non-critical areas on Cachalot like the superstructure, piping brackets, support framing and interior tanks, continued to use riveting for both the inner and outer hulls. During the war, the riveted boats would leak fuel oil.

The as-built engine specifications were two BuEng-built, MAN-designed M9Vu 40/46 nine-cylinder two-cycle direct drive main diesel engines,  each, with one BuEng MAN two-cycle auxiliary diesel engine, driving a  electrical generator. The auxiliary engine was for charging batteries or for increased surface speed via a diesel-electric system providing power to the main electric motors.

Due to the full double hull design, the external tanks proved too narrow for easy maintenance, and the MAN diesels were a constant headache, demanding re-engining with General Motors-Winton four-cycle 16-258 engines in 1936-38. On the other hand, the class made a major contribution to habitability, when Cuttlefish was the first sub fitted with air conditioning, and to effectiveness, being first fitted with the Mark I Torpedo Data Computer (TDC).

Service

Despite the calculation process, size reduction had gone too far with the Cachalots, limiting their patrol endurance. The subsequent Porpoise class were about 300 tons larger, and each succeeding class was incrementally larger than its predecessors through the  submarines of 1941 (with exception of the two experimental  submarines of 1939). After three Pacific war patrols each, the Cachalots were relegated to training duties in September 1942, as numerous Gato-class boats became available.

Ships in class

See also
 List of submarine classes of the United States Navy
 List of ship classes of the Second World War

Notes

References
 Schlesman, Bruce and Roberts, Stephen S., "Register of Ships of the U.S. Navy, 1775–1990: Major Combatants" (Greenwood Press, 1991), 
 Lenton, H. T. American Submarines (Navies of the Second World War) (Doubleday, 1973), 
 Silverstone, Paul H., U.S. Warships of World War II (Ian Allan, 1965), 
 Campbell, John Naval Weapons of World War Two (Naval Institute Press, 1985), 
 Whitman, Edward C.  "The Navy's Variegated V-Class: Out of One, Many?" Undersea Warfare, Fall 2003, Issue 20
 https://web.archive.org/web/20140322093118/http://www.fleetsubmarine.com/sublist.html
 Gardiner, Robert, Conway's All the World's Fighting Ships 1922–1946, Conway Maritime Press, 1980. .
 Friedman, Norman US Submarines through 1945: An Illustrated Design History, Naval Institute Press, Annapolis:1995, .
 Johnston, David "No More Heads or Tails: The Adoption of Welding in U.S. Navy Submarines", The Submarine Review, June 2020, pp.46-64.
 Navsource.org fleet submarines page
 Pigboats.com V-boats page
 DiGiulian, Tony Navweaps.com later 3"/50 caliber gun

External links

Submarine classes